Loosestrife is a common name for plants within two different genera:

Lythrum
Lysimachia

See also
 False loosestrife